Bonaventure was a middling ship of the English navy, built by Andrew Burrell at Deptford and launched in 1621.

Bonaventure was blown up in action in 1653.

Notes

References

Lavery, Brian (2003) The Ship of the Line - Volume 1: The development of the battlefleet 1650-1850. Conway Maritime Press. .

Ships of the English navy
Ships built in Deptford
1620s ships